Carpolobia alba is a plant species in the milkwort family (Polygalaceae) that is endemic to rainforests, forest fringes, and savanna-park with altitudes below  in Western Tropical Africa. Its branches are puberulous or shortly pubescent. Its leaves are membranous or slightly leathery. The flowers it produces are yellowish white or white with a crimson spot at the base of upper petals. It produces yellow or scarlet-coloured fruit which are edible and usually contain 3 seeds. It was first described by George Don in 1831. It is used traditionally as a medicine against sexual dysfunction.

References

Polygalaceae